Dryptosaurus is a genus of tyrannosauroid that lived during the end of the Maastrichtian age (approximately 67 to 66 million years ago) in the Late Cretaceous period in what is now New Jersey. Although largely unknown now outside of academic circles, a famous painting of the genus by Charles Knight made Dryptosaurus one of the most widely known dinosaurs of its time, regardless of its poor fossil record. First described by Edward Drinker Cope in 1866 and later renamed by Othniel Charles Marsh in 1877, Dryptosaurus is among the first theropod dinosaurs known to science.

Discovery and species

Prior to the discovery of Dryptosaurus in 1866, New World theropods were known only from some isolated theropod teeth discovered in Montana by Joseph Leidy in 1856. The discovery of Dryptosaurus gave North American paleontologists the opportunity to observe an articulated, albeit incomplete, theropod skeleton. During the late 19th century, this genus unfortunately became a wastebasket taxon for the referral of isolated theropod elements from across North America, given that tyrannosauroids were not recognized as a distinct group of large theropods at the time, and numerous theropod species were assigned to it (often as Lælaps or Laelaps), only to be later reclassified.

The genus name Dryptosaurus, means "tearing lizard", and is derived from the Greek words "dryptō", meaning "I tear" and "sauros" meaning "lizard". The specific name aquilunguis is derived from the Latin words for "having claws like an eagle's", which is a reference to the claws on its (at the time) three-fingered hand. E. D. Cope (1866) published a paper on the specimen within a week of its discovery and named it Laelaps aquilunguis at a meeting of the Academy of Natural Sciences in Philadelphia. "Laelaps", which is derived from the Greek for "hurricane" or "storm wind", was also the name of a dog in Greek mythology that never failed to catch what it was hunting. Laelaps gained its popularity as both a poetic and evocative name, becoming one of the first dinosaurs described from North America, alongside Hadrosaurus and Trachodon. It was later discovered that the name Laelaps had already been given to a genus of mite, and Cope's lifelong rival O.C. Marsh changed the name in 1877 to Dryptosaurus. The type species is Dryptosaurus aquilunguis.

Brusatte et al. (2011) noted that well-preserved historic casts of most of the type material from ANSP 9995 and AMNH FARB 2438 are housed in the collections of the Natural History Museum in London (NHM OR50100). The casts show some detail that is no longer preserved on the original specimens, which have significantly degraded due to pyrite disease.

Misassigned species
Laelaps trihedrodon was coined by Cope in 1877 for a partial dentary from the Morrison Formation of Colorado, which is now missing. Five damaged partial tooth crowns from AMNH 5780 mistakenly thought to have belonged to the L. trihedrodon holotype share many features in common with Allosaurus and probably belong to that genus instead. However, some of the Allosaurus-like characters of the teeth are primitive to theropods as a whole and may have been present in other large-bodied Morrison Formation theropod species.

Laelaps macropus was coined by Cope for a partial leg found in the Navesink Formation that Joseph Leidy had referred earlier to the ornithomimid Coelosaurus, distinguishing it from Dryptosaurus by its longer toes. Thomas Holtz listed it as an indeterminate tyrannosauroid in his contribution to the second edition of the Dinosauria. In 2017, it was informally given the new generic name “Teihivenator”. Earlier that year, Brownstein (2017) analyzed the material of Laelaps macropus and found that only the partial tibia could be definitely classified as that of a tyrannosauroid and that the distal metatarsal could’ve been from an ornithomimosaur. Brownstein also placed the pedal phalanges in Ornithimimosauria, though he didn’t create a lectotype for Laelaps macropus.

Description

Like its relative Eotyrannus, Dryptosaurus seems to have had relatively long arms when compared with more derived tyrannosaurs, such as Tyrannosaurus. Its hands, which are also relatively large, were believed to have had three fingers. Brusatte et al. (2011), however, observed an overall similarity in the shape of the available phalanges of Dryptosaurus with those of derived tyrannosaurids and noted that Dryptosaurus may have had only two functional fingers. Each of its fingers were tipped by an eight-inch, talon-like claw. Its arm morphology suggests that forelimb reduction in tyrannosauroids may not have proceeded in a uniform fashion. Dryptosaurus may have used both its arms and its jaws and as weapons when hunting, capturing, and eating its prey.

The type specimen is a fragmentary skeleton belonging to a single adult individual. ANSP 9995 consists of a fragmentary right maxilla, a fragmentary right dentary, a fragmentary right surangular, lateral teeth, 11 middle-distal caudal vertebrae, both the left and right humeri, three manual phalanges from the left hand (I-1, II-2, and an ungual), the shafts of the left and right pubic bones, a fragmentary right ischium, the left femur, the left tibia, the left fibula, the left astragalus, and a midshaft fragment of metatarsal III. The ontological maturity of the holotype individual is supported by the fact that the neurocentral sutures are closed in all of its caudal vertebrae. AMNH FARB 2438 consists of left metatarsal IV, which are likely from the same individual as the holotype.

The fragmentary right maxilla preserves the three alveoli in full and the fourth only partially. The authors were able to ascertain that Dryptosaurus had ziphodont dentition. The shape of the alveolus situated on the anterior portion of the fragment suggests that it housed a tooth that was smaller and more circular than the others, most likely being an incisiform tooth which is common in tyrannosauroids. The disarticulated teeth recovered are transversely narrow, serrated (17–18 denticles/cm), and recurved. The femur is only 3% longer than the tibia. The morphology of the proximal portion of metatarsal IV suggests that Dryptosaurus had an arctometatarsalian foot, an advanced feature shared by derived tyrannosauroids such as Albertosaurus and Tyrannosaurus, in which the third metatarsal is "pinched" between the second and fourth metatarsals.

According to Brusatte et al. (2011), Dryptosaurus can be distinguished based on the following characteristics: the combination of a reduced humerus (humerus: femur ratio = 0.375) and a large hand (phalanx I-1:femur ratio = 0.200), the strong mediolateral expansion of the ischial tubercle, which is approximately 1.7 times as wide as the shaft immediately distally, the presence of an ovoid fossa on the medial surface of the femoral shaft immediately proximal to the medial condyle, which is demarcated anteriorly by the mesiodistal crest and demarcated medially by a novel crest, the presence of a proximomedially trending ridge on the anterior surface of the fibula immediately proximal to the iliofibularis tubercle, the lip on the lateral surface of the lateral condyle of the astragalus is prominent and is overlapping the proximal surface of the calcaneum, and metatarsal IV is observed with a flat shaft proximally, resulting in a semiovoid cross section that is much wider mediolaterally than it is long anteroposteriorly.

Classification

Since its discovery, Dryptosaurus has been classified throughout a number of theropod families. Cope (1866), Leidy (1868) and Lydekker (1888) noted obvious similarities with the genus Megalosaurus which was known at the time from remains discovered in southeastern England and described by William Buckland. Based on this line of reasoning, Cope classified it as a megalosaurid. Marsh, however, examined the remains and later assigned to its own monotypic family, Dryptosauridae. The fossil material assigned to Dryptosaurus was reviewed by Ken Carpenter in 1997 in light of the many different theropods discovered since Cope's era. He felt that, due to some unusual features, it couldn't be placed in any existing family, and felt that it warranted placement in Dryptosauridae. This phylogenetic assignment was also supported by the work of Russell (1970) and Molnar (1990). Other phylogenetic studies during the 1990s suggested that Dryptosaurus was a coelurosaur, though its exact placement within that group remained uncertain.

In 1946, Charles W. Gilmore was the first to observe that certain anatomical features may link Dryptosaurus with coeval Late Cretaceous tyrannosaurids, such as Albertosaurus and Tyrannosaurus. This observation was also supported by the work of Baird and Horner (1979), but did not have any widespread acceptance until a new discovery was made in 2005. Dryptosaurus was the only large carnivore known in eastern North America until the discovery of the basal tyrannosauroid Appalachiosaurus in 2005. Appalachiosaurus, which is known from more complete remains, is similar to Dryptosaurus in both overall size and morphology. This discovery made it clear that Dryptosaurus was a primitive tyrannosauroid. Detailed phylogenetic analysis by Brusatte et al. (2013) confirmed the tyrannosauroid affinities of Dryptosaurus and assigned it as an "intermediate" tyrannosauroid that is more derived than basal tyrannosauroids, such as Guanlong and Dilong, but more primitive than members of the more derived Tyrannosauridae.

The following cladogram containing almost all tyrannosauroids is by Loewen et al. (2013).

Brown (2021) found Dryptosaurus to be the sister taxon to "Cryptotyrannus", an informally named theropod from the Merchantville Formation of Delaware. Brownstein (2021) also reinstated the family Dryptosauridae, which now includes both "Cryptotyrannus" and Dryptosaurus.

Paleoecology

The type specimen of Dryptosaurus ANSP 9995 was recovered in the West Jersey Marl Company Pit, in what came to be known as the Hornerstown Formation in Barnsboro, Mantua Township, in Gloucester County, New Jersey. The specimen was collected by quarry workers in marl and sandstone that were deposited during the late Maastrichtian age of the Late Cretaceous period, approximately 67 million years ago.

The southern New Jersey Hornerstown Formation in central New Jersey is also known as the New Egypt Formation. Studies suggest that the New Egypt Formation is a marine unit, considered to be the deeper-water equivalent of the Tinton and Red Bank formations. This formation overlies the Navesink Formation, from which potential Dryptosaurus referred material has been reported.

During the Maastrichtian, the Western Interior Seaway stretched in a north to south direction from the present-day Arctic Ocean down to the Gulf of Mexico, separating Dryptosaurus and its coeval fauna from western North America which was dominated by the larger tyrannosaurids. Although certainly a carnivore, the paucity of known Cretaceous East Coast dinosaurs make determining the specific diet of Dryptosaurus difficult. Hadrosaurids are known from the same time and place as Dryptosaurus, the island continent of Appalachia, and they may have been a highly prominent part of its diet. Nodosaurs were also present, although less likely to be hunted due to their bony spikes and armor plating. When hunting, both the toothy mouth and hands were important for the capture, killing, and eating of prey.

Cultural significance

The 1897 watercolor painting by Charles Knight titled Leaping Laelaps may represent the earliest depiction of theropods as highly active and dynamic animals. Knight's artistic hand was guided by E. D. Cope, and reflects their progressive opinions on theropod agility despite their large size, as well as the opinion of Henry Fairfield Osborn, the curator of vertebrate paleontology at the American Museum of Natural History at the time of the painting's commission. The original painting is now preserved in the AMNH collections. By contrast, the typical illustrations of large carnivorous dinosaurs like Megalosaurus, in the late 1800s, depicted the animals as large, tail-dragging, reptilian behemoths.

See also

 Timeline of tyrannosaur research

References

 
  - Cretaceous Dinosaurs of the Southeastern United States by David T. King Jr.

External links
 [http://njfossils.net/meateating.html Dryptosaurus aquilunguis

Tyrannosaurs
Late Cretaceous dinosaurs of North America
Maastrichtian life
Fossil taxa described in 1877
Taxa named by Othniel Charles Marsh
Paleontology in New Jersey
Maastrichtian genus first appearances
Maastrichtian genus extinctions